Drugovo is a former municipality in western North Macedonia, created in the 1996 territorial organisation and dissolved following the 2013 Macedonian new territorial organisation, after it was merged with Kičevo Municipality.
 Drugovo is also the name of the village where the municipal seat was found.
 Drugovo Municipality was part of the Southwestern Statistical Region.
 The last mayor of the municipality was Dobre Nikoski.

Geography
The municipality bordered
Debar Municipality to the west,
Mavrovo and Rostuša Municipality to the northwest,
Zajas Municipality to the northeast,
 Kičevo Municipality, Vraneštica Municipality, Plasnica Municipality, and Kruševo Municipality to the east,
Demir Hisar Municipality to the southeast, and
Debarca Municipality to the southwest.

Demographics
According to the last national census from 2002, Drugovo Municipality has 3,249 inhabitants.
Ethnic groups in the municipality include:
Macedonians = 2,784 (85.7%)
Turks = 292 (9.0%)
Albanians = 155 (4.8%)
others = 18 (0.6%)

The total number of students in the municipality in 2011, in comparison to the total number of students in 2007, declined for about 30%. Drugovo is the third municipality in North Macedonia by the decline of the total number of students.

Inhabited places
Settlements in the municipality include
Belica, Brzhdani, Vidrani, Grand Crsko,
Upper Dushegubica, Dobrenoec Upper,
Lower Dushegubica, Lower Dobrenoec,
Drugovo, Ehloec, Ivanchishta, Source,
Javorec, Judovo, Kladnik, Klenoec, Kozica,
Lavchani, Malkoec, Malo Crsko,
Monastery Dolenci, Podvis, Popoec, Popolzhani,
Prostranje, Svinjishte, Srbjani and Cer.

References

External links

 Official website

Former municipalities of North Macedonia
Kičevo Municipality